Zgornji Kozji Vrh is a small dispersed settlement in the hills above the left bank of the Drava River in the Municipality of Radlje ob Dravi in Slovenia.

History
Zgornji Kozji Vrh was created as a separate settlement in 1994, when it was administratively separated from Kozji Vrh in the neighboring Municipality of Podvelka.

References

External links
 Zgornji Kozji Vrh on Geopedia
 Population of Zgornji Kozji Vrh

Populated places in the Municipality of Radlje ob Dravi